Maciek Miernik (born Maciej Stanislaw Miernik) is a bass guitar playing rock musician, composer, sound editor, recording engineer and producer. He has appeared in many groups such as Aurora, 1984, Noah-Noah, Restrykcja, Reflection-NY band, King Poyaviack, Flashback as well as producing songs ranging from progressive rock and progressive punk. He is known for his avant-garde multimedia productions.

His production credits include some of the most respected albums by Alan Lomax.[]

In 2003, he received an honorable mention for the Alan Lomax Archive in the 45th Grammy Trustees Award, New York City.

See also
 List of Poles
 Music of Poland

External links
recording studio

Year of birth missing (living people)
Living people
Polish composers